This list of fictional rodents is subsidiary to the list of fictional animals and covers all rodents, including beavers, mice, chipmunks, gophers, guinea pigs, hamsters,florence,marmots, prairie dogs, porcupines and squirrels, as well as extinct or prehistoric species. Rodents, particularly rats and mice, feature in literature, myth and legend. The North American Salish people have an epic tale in which the Beaver, rejected by Frog Woman, sings a rain-power song that results in a disastrous flood.

Mickey Mouse, the cheerful, anthropomorphic cartoon character, was a tremendous success for The Walt Disney Company in 1928. Mice feature in some of Beatrix Potter's small books, including The Tale of Two Bad Mice (1904), The Tale of Mrs Tittlemouse (1910), The Tale of Johnny Town-Mouse (1918), and The Tailor of Gloucester (1903), which last was described by J. R. R. Tolkien as perhaps the nearest to his idea of a fairy story, the rest being "beast-fables". Among Aesop's Fables are The Frog and the Mouse and The Lion and the Mouse.

Literature

Comics

Folklore and mythology

Film

Music

Television

Animation

Video games

Mascots and others

References

Further reading
 Dawson, Warren R. "The Mouse in Fable and Folklore." Folklore 36, no. 3 (1925): 227-48. www.jstor.org/stable/1256048.

Rodents